Michelle (stylized in all caps as MICHELLE) is a six-piece indie-pop collective based in New York City. The group consists of Sofia D'Angelo, Julian Kaufman, Charlie Kilgore, Layla Ku, Emma Lee, and Jamee Lockard.

History
Michelle was originally formed by producers Julian Kaufman and Charlie Kilgore with the plan to release one album dedicated to New York City.  After the critical praise of their 2018 debut album HEATWAVE, completed before the members met in person, the group decided to keep on making music together.

In 2020, Michelle released two standalone singles, "SUNRISE" and "UNBOUND". "SUNRISE" came out on July 16, 2020. There were three alternate versions released in the subsequent months: a stripped version, one featuring Arlo Parks, and a remix by the booyah! kids featuring Deem Spencer. "UNBOUND" came out on October 5, 2020 which landed them on NME's 2021 Top 100 emerging artists list. Michelle released another standalone single, "FYO", on January 27, 2021. The group later released a remix with CHAI.

On September 14, 2021, Michelle released their new song, "SYNCOPATE", the first single off their second album. The next day, they announced the title and tracklist of their upcoming album, AFTER DINNER WE TALK DREAMS, set to release on January 28, 2022. The group released the album's second single, "MESS U MADE" on October 27, 2021. The third single, "EXPIRATION DATE" was released on January 5, 2022. Michelle released their fourth single from the album, "POSE", on February 28, 2022. Their second album, AFTER DINNER WE TALK DREAMS, came out on March 4, 2022. On October 18, 2022, Michelle released a new song, "PULSE".

Discography

Albums

Singles

References

Indie pop groups from New York (state)
Musical groups from New York City